Alexander Henry Dennett (1894 – 4 December 1956) was an Australian politician.

He was born in Melbourne to John Dennett and Dorothy Neale and became an Anglican lay preacher in Gippsland before serving in World War I. On his return he became a journalist, working first for the Star and then for the Argus. On 4 November 1922 he married Henrietta Jean Mathieson, with whom he had two children. During World War II he served in the Middle East and the Pacific, and received the rank of lieutenant-colonel.

In 1945 he was elected to the Victorian Legislative Assembly as the Liberal member for Caulfield. He was party whip from 1945 to 1947, when he became Minister of Agriculture and Forests. He briefly held the Labour and Decentralisation portfolios in December 1948, and remained on the front bench until 1950. A supporter of Thomas Hollway, he was the deputy of the Liberal rebels who broke away from the Liberal and Country Party in 1952 to vote against the McDonald Country Party government.

He was Deputy Premier and Minister of Forests, Conservation and Immigration in the seventy-hour Hollway ministry that followed that action, and served as deputy of the group that became the Victorian Liberal Party until 1955, when he lost his seat.

Dennett died at Heidelberg the following year.

References

1894 births
1956 deaths
Liberal Party of Australia members of the Parliament of Victoria
Victorian Liberal Party members of the Parliament of Victoria
Members of the Victorian Legislative Assembly
Victorian Ministers for the Environment
20th-century Australian politicians
Victorian Ministers for Agriculture